Arthur Michael Samuel, 1st Baron Mancroft (6 December 1872 – 17 August 1942) was a British Conservative politician.

Background
Lord Mancroft was the eldest son of Benjamin Samuel, of Norwich (19 April 1840 – 16 April 1890), and Rosetta Haldinstein (died 29 April 1907, daughter of Philip Haldinstein and wife Rachel Soman), and grandson of Michael Samuel (1799–1857), all of them were Ashkenazi Jews.

Early life
He was educated at Norwich School. He was Lord Mayor of Norwich from 1912 to 1913. He as the first Jewish Lord Mayor of Norwich  and was made an Honorary Freeman of the City of Norwich in 1928.

Member of Parliament
in the two General elections of 1910 he stood for the Conservatives in the Stretford division of Lancashire, near Manchester, but was unsuccessful on both occasions. In 1918 he was elected as Member of Parliament (MP) for Farnham, a seat he would hold until 1937, and served under Stanley Baldwin as Secretary for Overseas Trade from 1924 to 1927 and as Financial Secretary to the Treasury from 1927 to 1929. He was also chairman of the Public Accounts Committee of the House of Commons in 1930 and 1931. Samuel was created a Baronet, of Mancroft, in the City of Norwich in the County of Norfolk, on 15 January 1932, and on 23 December 1937, he was raised to the peerage as Baron Mancroft, of Mancroft (referring to the area around St Peter Mancroft church) in the City of Norwich.

Family
Lord Mancroft married Phoebe Fletcher, daughter of George Alfred Chune Fletcher and wife, in 1912. He died in August 1942, aged 69, and was succeeded in the baronetcy and the barony by his son Stormont Mancroft, 2nd Baron Mancroft. He was also to become a Conservative government minister.

The papers of Lord Mancroft are in the Churchill Archives Centre, Churchill College, Cambridge.

Author
He published: "Life of Giovanni Battista Piranesi"; "The Working of the Bill of Exchange with an Explanation of the Overseas Trade Balance"; "The Herring: its Effect on the History of Britain"; and "The Mancroft Essays".

Arms

References

Sources

1872 births
1942 deaths
Politicians from Norwich
British people of Jewish descent
British Ashkenazi Jews
People educated at Norwich School
Samuel, Arthur
Samuel, Arthur
Samuel, Arthur
Samuel, Arthur
Samuel, Arthur
Samuel, Arthur
Samuel, Arthur
Samuel, Arthur
UK MPs who were granted peerages
Mayors of Norwich
Jewish British politicians
Barons created by George VI